Kim Cha-Youn (born February 10, 1981) is a South Korean handball player who competed in the 2004 Summer Olympics.

In 2004, she won the silver medal with the South Korean team. She played all seven matches and scored 19 goals.

External links
 Profile
 The Official Website of the Beijing 2008 Olympic Games

1981 births
Living people
South Korean female handball players
Olympic handball players of South Korea
Handball players at the 2004 Summer Olympics
Handball players at the 2008 Summer Olympics
Handball players at the 2012 Summer Olympics
Olympic silver medalists for South Korea
Olympic bronze medalists for South Korea
Olympic medalists in handball
Expatriate handball players
South Korean expatriate sportspeople in Japan
Medalists at the 2008 Summer Olympics
Medalists at the 2004 Summer Olympics
Asian Games medalists in handball
Handball players at the 2002 Asian Games
Handball players at the 2006 Asian Games
Handball players at the 2010 Asian Games
Asian Games gold medalists for South Korea
Asian Games bronze medalists for South Korea
Medalists at the 2002 Asian Games
Medalists at the 2006 Asian Games
Medalists at the 2010 Asian Games